Red Gloves is a play by Jean-Paul Sartre. It appeared on Broadway in 1948 in a production starring John Dall and Charles Boyer.

It was originally called Crime Passionel. Jed Haris directed the Broadway production.

Satre successfully sued the producers of the adaptation saying it had distorted his play.

References

1948 plays